Aadujeevitham is an upcoming Malayalam-language  survival drama film written, directed, and co-produced by Blessy in an international co-production between India and the United States. The film contains Arabic and Malayalam dialogues. It is a cinematic adaption of the 2008 Malayalam novel of the same name by Benyamin. The film stars Prithviraj Sukumaran as Najeeb, a Malayali immigrant worker enslaved as a goatherd in a Saudi Arabian farm. The original score and songs were composed by A. R. Rahman.

The film was in development hell since 2008. Blessy wanted to adapt Aadujeevitham ever since he read the novel in 2008. Prithviraj was cast in the same year, thenceforth there was no progress since the budget was not viable for a Malayalam film. For years, Blessy searched for a producer until he found K. G. Abraham and the film was set in motion in 2015. Principal photography took place in phases between March 2018 and July 2022 through five schedules in the deserts of Wadi Rum, Jordan and the Sahara, Algeria, and some scenes in Kerala, India. The crew was stranded in Jordan for 70 days during the 2020 COVID-19 pandemic. Principal photography of the film concluded on 14 July 2022.

Aadujeevitham, shot in 3D, is planning to have a world premiere at any major film festival in 2023, possibly at the 2023 Cannes Film Festival, and tentatively scheduled to be released in theatres worldwide sometime in the later half of 2023.

Cast

Production

Development 
In 2009, Blessy had a discourse with journalist and writer V. K. Ravi Varma Thampuran about forgotten tradition of adapting literary works for cinema, which was a fashion in the 1970s and 1980s Malayalam cinema. Adapting something had been in his mind. In 2010, it was reported that Blessy was adapting Benyamin's 2008 Malayalam novel Aadujeevitham to a feature film. Blessy said, it was the novel that inspired him to adapt. In April 2010, he told to The Hindu that he was working on the screenplay and the film would be made on a wider canvas, and Prithviraj Sukumaran had been cast in the leading role. In the novel, Kayamkulam native Najeeb Muhammad goes missing in Saudi Arabia where he ends up as a slave to a farm owner. Blessy wanted to adapt it for a big-budget film ever since he read it in 2008, "I was particularly attracted to the visual images that came through while reading the book". He began writing the screenplay after obtaining permission from Benyamin. Blessy said that the film contained more material than what was present in the book.

Reportedly, filming was set to begin in August 2010 at the deserts of Dubai and Rajasthan. However, it did not go off. In 2012, Benyamin said that the film was still on discussion phase and had been postponed for the time being since its production cost was found to be not viable for a Malayalam film. Blessy had been discussing the film with Prithviraj since 2008 . In 2015, recalling the film's stagnant development to date, Prithviraj said that there were occasions when they could work out the film, albeit with some compromises, but Blessy insisted on waiting for the right producer since he was not ready to compromise his vision. For years, Blessy was searching for a producer until he met industrialist K. G. Abraham and the project was greenlit in 2015 as a 3D film. An official announcement of the same was held on 5 November 2015 at Kuwait. According to Prithviraj, Blessy had conceived Aadujeevitham as an "event film" in the lines of Life of Pi as the narrative goes from one event to the other non-linearly.

Parallel to the new announcement, also in November 2015, Blessy told to The Hindu that he was occupied with the research work of another film, which would be disclosed later, which would go on before Aadujeevitham. In May 2016, Blessy confirmed that he was busy with the pre-production work of the Hindi remake of his Malayalam film Thanmathra (2005) and Aadujeevitham would happen only after that. He later updated that work of both the films were progressing simultaneously and casting and scheduling would decide which film would go on first. Meanwhile, he was already through the production of documentary film 100 Years of Chrysostom (2018) which had begun earlier in May 2015, which he would complete in two years. In October 2016, Blessy said Aadujeevitham would begin filming in early 2017 and release in 2018. In mid-2017, he said that they had the screenplay ready but the locations had not been decided and production would start in November 2017 and the film would take 18 months to release.

On the challenges on adapting the novel, Blessy said the novel is about Najeeb recollecting his experience in his soliloquy, it is easy to convey that in a literary work, but depicting that on screen is a difficult task. The way the story is told in the film is entirely different. In the latter half of the book, when arbab castigates Najeeb in Arabic, readers read it in Malayalam; unlike the book, the film has to show how much the language distresses Najeeb. Also, the film has no privilege to be vague since viewers sees everything on screen and can question the logic, the book says Najeeb could not even find a shadow under a stick, but there is a farm that can cast shadow, "in a literary work, you don't have to address that because readers travel the route the writer takes them on". Similarly, the film has to show Najeeb's physical transformation. Over everything else, the film's visuals has to be superior than the visuals imagined by the readers. Najeeb is a Malayali who does not understands Arabic, so the makers decided to not include subtitles for those parts since they do not want the viewers to understand that either. According to Prithviraj, "the film has this huge liberty of not having a language", only about 20 percent of the film contains dialogues.

Casting 
Prithviraj agreed to do the film while he was at the sets of Pokkiri Raja (2010) in 2008. Najeeb Muhammad from Benyamin's novel is based on a real-life person with the same name. Prithviraj said, although he is not a pious person, Najeeb has staunch focus on faith. There is a physical, psychological, and spiritual journey for the character. For three years, he interacts more with animals than humans, so he would "become" one among. For Najeeb's role, Blessy wanted an actor who can dedicate at least one-and-a-half years for the film, which Prithviraj agreed. Prithviraj had to gain and loss weight to show Najeeb's physical transformation on screen, he gained 98 kilograms for playing the character in the starting sequences of the film with a pot belly and had to loss weight to 67 kilograms by the end of the film. Having lost 31 kilograms, Prithviraj said he followed an unhealthy diet which he would not recommend anyone to follow. He blacked-out while filming a scene. There was always a doctor on call at the set.

As of 2015, no other actor beside Prithviraj was finalised. In 2016, Blessy said he is scouting for actors in Somalia and such places. In 2017, a casting call was released by the makers through social media inviting applicants for a young male and female and a middle-aged female. In February 2018, Amala Paul confirmed through social media that she is playing Sainu. Sainu, Najeeb's wife, is portrayed in different phases of her life. According to Blessy, the role would tap the potential of Amala, considering the roles she had done so far. Beside co-producing, Haitian actor Jimmy Jean-Louis played a major role as Ibrahim Khadiri. Omani actor Talib al Balushi played the role of Najeeb's boss. Rik Aby, a Sudanese actor based in the United Arab Emirates also played a role.

Filming 
Although the film is set in Saudi Arabia, the team did not received permission to shoot there, hence they had to shift location to other countries. On his decision to shoot the film in 3D, Blessy said "the 3D technology will really help in elevating the overall mood. The desert wind, a small movement of the goat, the loneliness of Najeeb ... the 3D tool will help in capturing these emotions and transforming it to a different aesthetic level". The film's major scenes takes place in desert places. Principal photography began on 1 March 2018 with a customary pooja function. The first schedule began in Thiruvalla, Kerala. Flashback scenes before Najeeb began his miserable life in Saudi Arabia was shot there. As of then, the plan was to complete filming in 150 days spanning 18 months. That month, filming also took place at Muthalamada railway station in Palakkad border. The Kerala schedule was completed by April first week. About 25 percent of the film was finished, with major portions remaining to be shot.

The second schedule in Wadi Rum desert in Jordan, originally charted from March to early April 2020, was delayed by the COVID-19 pandemic in Jordan. Filming began on 16 March. However, Omani actor Talib al Balushi and his translator was quaratined, he missed the shoot after Oman evacuated their citizens. Similarly, a Sudanese actor was quarantined. Some actors were not able to reach due to cancellation of flights. The shoot continued with Prithviraj. After Jordan initiated lockdown, Kerala chief minister directed NORKA to provide assistance through Indian embassy. Since international flights were cancelled and they cannot return, Jordanian authorities allowed them to continue shooting staying isolated. After eight days shoot, they were forced to stop on 24 March. They managed to get permission to shoot for another 17 days. However, permission was revoked on 27 March after curfew was imposed. Blessy requested Kerala government through Kerala Film Chamber of Commerce to repatriate them. They stayed idle for next 32 days. Prithviraj reduced his body mass further down. When restrictions eased, filming restarted in April last week. It continued till 17 May. The 58-member crew, along with other Indian citizens, were repatriated by the Government of India as part of Vande Bharat Mission and reached India on 22 May. In their 70 days stay in the desert camp, they filmed for 25 days. Although filming was not finished there, crucial scenes were shot, needing to return. Even with their original plan, they had to return for taking scenes featuring an American actor. About 50 percent of the film was completed with the second schedule.

Filming was undergoing at the Sahara desert, Algeria in April 2022. As per their plan, they needed 40 days in Algeria and another 35 days in Jordan. Algerian schedule continued to May. In the same month, shooting happened at Wadi Rum, Jordan. Jordanian schedule was completed on 14 June, thus concluding the film's international schedules. Filming went to Ranni, Kerala on 22 June for the final schedule. Jail sequence was shot there on set. Filming in its entirety was wrapped up on 14 July 2022. K. U. Mohanan and Sunil K. S. were the cinematographers, Resul Pookutty was the sound designer, A. Sreekar Prasad was the editor, Stephy Zaviour was the costume designer, and Ranjith Ambady was the makeup artist. In October 2022, Prithviraj told to Variety that the film is undergoing post-production and is aiming for a film festival slot in 2023.

Music 
The film's original background score and songs were composed by A. R. Rahman. Rahman confirmed his association during an interaction with the press in January 2018. In November 2019, Rahman said he has completed recording a song by Vijay Yesudas, visuals of the song had already been shot, and would record another song by Chinmayi. In May 2022, Rahman said he has not yet started composing the score, but has completed individual songs. He described the songs as "mostly situational, more like a lullaby, lament-like, in addition to a love song. Even though I was supposed to do one song, I ended up doing three to four songs for the film".

Release
During the promotion of Kaapa (2022) in December 2022, Prithviraj said Aadujeevitham would premiere at 2023 Cannes Film Festival if its post-production completes in due time, if that happens, then its worldwide theatrical release would be in the later half of 2023. But if it cannot make it to Cannes, then the film would premiere at next major film festival.

References

External links
 

Upcoming films
Indian drama films
Films based on Indian novels
Films directed by Blessy
Films about slavery
Indian prison films
Films about immigration
Films set in Saudi Arabia
Films set in deserts
Films scored by A. R. Rahman
Films shot in Jordan
Films shot in Algeria
Films shot in Palakkad
Drama films based on actual events
Indian films based on actual events
Film productions suspended due to the COVID-19 pandemic